Chungjeong of Goryeo (9 January 1338 – 23 March 1352, r. 1348–1351), born Wang Jeo, was the 30th ruler of the Goryeo dynasty of Korea and was enthroned by imperial edict at the age of 12. He was sometimes known by his Mongolian name, Chosgen Dorji, which was rendered in hanja as Misagamtaaji.

Biography
During King Chungjeong's brief reign, the politics of the court were controlled by powerful relatives of the royal family, including his mother's relative Yun Si-u and the retainer Bae Jeon. In addition, the country endured heavy Wokou raids beginning in 1349.

King Chungjeong's uncle Wang Gi secured imperial favor and married a Yuan daughter, Princess Noguk. Shortly thereafter King Chungjeong was deposed, and Wang Gi ascended the throne as King Gongmin.

Family 
Parents

Father: Wang Jeong, King Chunghye of Goryeo (고려충혜 왕정)(22 February 1315 – 30 January 1344)
Grandfather: Wang Man, King Chungsuk of Goryeo (고려 충숙 왕만)(30 July 1294 – 3 May 1339)
Grandmother: Queen Gongwon of the Namyang Hong clan (공원왕후 홍씨)
Mother: Royal Consort Hui of the Papyeong Yun clan (희비 윤씨; d. 1380)
Grandfather: Yun Gye-jong (윤계종, d. September 1346)
Grandmother: Lady Min of the Yeoheung Min clan (여흥 민씨)
Illegitimate son: Wang Je (왕제)

In popular culture
Portrayed by Choi Young-joo in the 2005–2006 MBC TV series Shin Don.
Portrayed by Choi Won-hong in the 2012 SBS TV series Faith.

See also
 List of Korean monarchs
 Goryeo
 Korea under Yuan rule

References

 

1352 deaths
Year of birth uncertain
1338 births
14th-century Korean monarchs
Korean Buddhist monarchs